The Cochin–Travancore Alliance was an alliance between the Kingdom of Cochin and the Kingdom of Travancore established in 1761 that had the goal of expelling the forces of the Zamorin of Calicut from regions of Cochin they had occupied the decade before. The alliance stipulated that the king of Travancore would help to liberate the occupied Cochinese territories in exchange for being allowed to retain the areas of Cochin they had annexed in 1755 and 1756.

Results 
As a result of the agreement and because of Travancore's obligation to defend Cochinese territory, the well-known Travancore Defence Lines were constructed.

The allied forces of Travancore and Cochin quickly defeated the Zamorin's army at Cranganore, Parur, and Verappalli, which expanded Travancore's influence from Cape Comorin to Cranganore, while simultaneously diminishing the territory of Cochin and placing them in a precarious situation.

During these engagements, the forces of Travancore were led by Eustachius De Lannoy, the Flemish commander associated with the Battle of Colachel.

Aftermath and Dissolving 
After the Dutch in the area withdrew their support from the weakened Cochin, Travancore turned on the kingdom, and both Calicut and Travancore forces marched to Cochin. The Calicut forces invaded from the north and quickly occupied several strongholds while the Travancore invaded from the south. Under pressure from the two neighboring powers and lacking support, Cochin soon sued for another peace treaty with Travancore.

References

Kingdom of Cochin
Kingdom of Travancore
1761 in India
Travancore–Cochin